Ashlee Palmer (born April 7, 1986) is a former American football linebacker. He was signed by the Buffalo Bills as an undrafted free agent in 2009. He played college football at Mississippi. On May 26, 2012, Palmer was inducted into the Compton Community College Athletics Hall of Fame, under the category of Football.

Professional career

Buffalo Bills
Palmer was signed by the Buffalo Bills as an undrafted free agent following the 2009 NFL Draft on May 1, 2009. He was waived on February 16, 2010.

Detroit Lions
Palmer was claimed off waivers by the Detroit Lions on February 18, 2010.

He was not re-signed by the Lions after the conclusion of the 2014 NFL season.

New York Giants
Palmer signed with the New York Giants on August 24, 2015. On September 5, 2015, the Giants cut Palmer.

References

External links
Buffalo Bills bio

1986 births
Living people
Players of American football from Compton, California
American football linebackers
Ole Miss Rebels football players
Buffalo Bills players
Detroit Lions players
El Camino College Compton Center alumni
New York Giants players